Caradrina gilva is a moth of the family Noctuidae. It is endemic to southern Central Europe.The eastern distribution extends to the Middle East up to Turkey. In the Alps it reaches heights of about 1600 meters. Isolated records in other regions indicate that the species is sometimes migratory and it has recently been expanding its range. The first sighting in Spain was in 2007 and in The Netherlands June 1, 2009 in Geulle.The main habitat is warm, rocky mountain slopes, occasionally also grassy areas.

Subspecies
There are two recognised subspecies:
Caradrina gilva gilva
Caradrina gilva orientalis

External links

Fauna Europaea
Lepiforum.de
Vlindernet.nl 

Caradrinini
Moths of Europe
Moths of Asia
Moths described in 1837